The 2000 CHA Men's Ice Hockey Tournament (also known as the 2000 CHA Final Five) was played between March 10 and March 12, 2000, at the Von Braun Center in Huntsville, Alabama. Niagara defeated Alabama-Huntsville 3–2 in the championship game to win the inaugural tournament.

Format
The tournament featured three rounds of play. The top five teams in the regular season conference standings advanced to the tournament. In the first round, the fourth and fifth ranked seeds, Air Force and Findlay, played for entry into the semifinals, to which the top three seeds received byes. The winners of the two semifinal games then played for the championship on March 12, 2000.

Conference standings
Note: GP = Games played; W = Wins; L = Losses; T = Ties; PTS = Points; GF = Goals For; GA = Goals Against

Bracket

Note: * denotes overtime period(s)

Quarterfinal

(4) Air Force vs. (5) Findlay

Semifinals

(1) Niagara vs. (4) Air Force

(2) Alabama-Huntsville vs. (3) Bemidji State

Third Place Game

(3) Bemidji State vs. (4) Air Force

Championship

(1) Niagara vs. (2) Alabama-Huntsville

Tournament awards

All-Star team
Goaltender: Greg Gardner (Niagara)
Defensemen: Chris MacKenzie (Niagara), Shane Stewart (Alabama-Huntsville)
Forwards: Nathan Bowen (Alabama-Huntsville), Jay Kasparek (Niagara), Kyle Martin (Niagara)

MVP

Kyle Martin (Niagara)

References

External links
College Hockey America tournament history

CHA Men's Ice Hockey Tournament
Cha Men's Ice Hockey Tournament
CHA Men's Ice Hockey